Darshan Kumar Khullar is an Indian mountaineer, writer and a former brigadier of the Indian Army. He led the Everest expedition which included Bachendri Pal and Phu Dorjee that summitted the peak in May 1984. The Government of India awarded him the fourth highest Indian civilian honour of Padma Shri in 1984.

Biography
Born in 1941 at Bassi Pathana in Fatehgarh Sahib district in the Indian state of Punjab, Khullar did his education at the  Rashtriya Indian Military College, Dehradun and was commissioned in 1961. He participated in the Sino-Indian War of 1962 and rose in ranks to become a brigadier and the principal of the Himalayan Mountaineering Institute (HMI), Darjeeling (1981–85). He was chosen as the leader of the 1984 Everest expedition team composed of eleven men and six women which summitted the peak in May 1984 through the South East Ridge route. The team included Bachendri Pal, the first Indian woman to scale Mount Everest and Phu Dorjee, the first Indian to climb the peak without oxygen. He took voluntary retirement from the army in 1993.

Khullar is a member of the Expedition Commission of the International Mountaineering and Climbing Federation, Berne, Swtizerland. He is the author of several books on mountaineering and international politics and has co-authored the second book written by Bachendri Pal in 2006 about the Trans-Himalayan all-women expedition of 1997. Some of his other publications are:
 The Call of Everest: First Ascent by an Indian Woman
 A Mountain of Happiness
 When Generals Failed: The Chinese Invasion: Abdiction from Battle, Tawang, Sela, and Bomdila, 1962
 Security, Peace and Honour
 Pakistan, Our Difficult Neighbour and Allied Issues
 Pakistan our Difficult Neighbour and India's Islamic Dimensions

The Government of India awarded him the civilian honour of Padma Shri in 1984. Khullar lives a retired life in Ambala in Haryana.

See also

 Bachendri Pal
 Phu Dorjee

Indian summiters of Mount Everest - Year wise
List of Mount Everest summiters by number of times to the summit
List of Mount Everest records of India
List of Mount Everest records

References

Recipients of the Padma Shri in sports
1941 births
Living people
People from Fatehgarh Sahib district
Military personnel from Punjab, India
Rashtriya Indian Military College alumni
Mountain climbers from Punjab, India
Indian summiters of Mount Everest
Writers from Punjab, India
Indian Army personnel
Recipients of the Arjuna Award